Fremont Street is a street in downtown Las Vegas, Nevada that is the second most famous street in the Las Vegas Valley – and Nevada – besides the Las Vegas Strip.  Named in honor of explorer and politician John C. Frémont and located in the heart of the downtown casino corridor, Fremont Street is today, or was, the address for many famous casinos such as Binion's Horseshoe, Eldorado Club, Fremont Hotel and Casino, Golden Gate Hotel and Casino, Golden Nugget, Four Queens, The Mint, and the Pioneer Club.

Prior to the construction of the Fremont Street Experience, the western end of Fremont Street was the representative scene for Las Vegas that was included in virtually every television show and movie that wanted to depict the glittery lights of Las Vegas.  The abundance of neon signs, like cowboy Vegas Vic, earned the street the nickname of "Glitter Gulch".

Fremont Street is designated between Main Street and Sahara Avenue in a northwest–southeast direction, although auto traffic actually begins at Las Vegas Boulevard.  At Sahara, it leaves Las Vegas proper and continues as Boulder Highway.  Fremont Street formerly carried several national highways, including U.S. Route 93 (US 93), US 95, and US 466. US 93 and US 95 have been rerouted along Interstate 515, while US 466 has been decommissioned. The section of Fremont Street east of the Fremont East District is currently designated Nevada State Route 582.

Although prostitution has been illegal in Clark County since 1971, the street has a reputation for prostitution.

History 

Fremont Street dates back to 1905, when Las Vegas itself was founded.  Fremont Street was the first paved street in Las Vegas in 1925 and received the city's first traffic light in 1931. Fremont Street also carried the shields of U.S. Route 93 (US 93), US 95, and US 466 before the construction of the interstate freeways, including I-15.

While gambling was established prior to being legalized, the Northern Club in 1931 received one of the first 6 gambling licenses issued in Nevada, and the first one for Fremont Street.

Glitter Gulch on Fremont Street, was closed to vehicle traffic in September, 1994, to begin construction on the Fremont Street Experience.

Film and media history 

 The 1950 Charlton Heston film Dark City features a walk along Fremont Street.
 The 1964 Elvis Presley film Viva Las Vegas featured nighttime footage of Fremont Street during the opening credits.
 The 1971 James Bond film Diamonds Are Forever featured a chase scene in which James Bond, running from Las Vegas police, side-rolls a car through an alley exiting onto Fremont Street.
 The 1978–81 ABC television series Vega$, starring Robert Urich, had its episode intro, and many scenes, filmed on Fremont Street.
 The 1987 music video for the song "I Still Haven't Found What I'm Looking For" by U2 was filmed on Fremont Street and featured the band members wandering around, while The Edge played an acoustic guitar.
 In the 1987 anthology film Aria, one of the segments involves two young lovers driving down Fremont Street before attempting suicide.
 The second season of the NBC show Crime Story (1986–1988) featured Fremont Street in its opening credits, and nearly all the action took place there, as opposed to the Strip.
 1998's Very Bad Things featured Fremont Street in the movie.
 1992's Honey, I Blew Up the Kid prominently featured Fremont Street in the movie.
 1992's Cool World showed all the animation coming out of the Union Plaza Hotel and going down Fremont Street.
 In 1994, Glitter Gulch was featured prominently in the TV miniseries The Stand.
 The 1997 comedy Vegas Vacation includes a few scenes on Fremont Street.
 The Flaming Lips filmed part of their video for "Do You Realize??" in Fremont Street
 In the 2004 movie Dodgeball: A True Underdog Story, Steve the Pirate is seen along the Plaza near the Fremont Street Experience.
 In a 2005 release, Panic! at the Disco released a song about Fremont Street called "Build God, Then We'll Talk".
 Fremont Street appears in the 2004 video game Grand Theft Auto: San Andreas as "The Old Las Venturas Strip".
 The 2007 film Next has Nicolas Cage's character entering the Golden Nugget from the Fremont Street Experience.
 Ice Cube's music video for "Chrome and Paint" took place on Fremont Street, with Ice Cube in a lowrider.
 In Tom Clancy's Rainbow Six: Vegas, Logan Keller, and his teammates Jung, and Michael infiltrate Fremont Street to find a news van, which they find by going through the maintenance tunnels under the Sirocco Casino,  the game's version of the Binion Hotel and Gambling Hall.
 Heavily referenced in the Tom Waits song "Mr. Siegal".
 Featured at the beginning of the TV series - CSI season 7 finale episode 24.
 Magician and illusionist Criss Angel has done many demonstrations there.
 Featured in The Real World: Las Vegas (2011). Several cast members ziplined across the Fremont Street Experience in an episode.
 The area is featured in the 2013 comedy The Incredible Burt Wonderstone, when a street magician (Jim Carrey) performs his magic tricks before two of the main characters, played by Steve Carell and Steve Buscemi.
 Fremont Street is featured intermittently throughout the 2013 comedy Last Vegas, starting with the main quartet (Robert De Niro, Michael Douglas, Morgan Freeman and Kevin Kline) arriving at Binion's Gambling Hall and Hotel.
 A destroyed Fremont Street is featured in the 2010 post-apocalyptic RPG, Fallout: New Vegas. The area is mapped as 'Freeside' and is a slum.
 The Weeknd filmed a music video for his 2019 songs "Heartless" and "Blinding Lights" on Fremont Street.

Fremont East 

In 2002 the city of Las Vegas created the Fremont East Entertainment District (FEED), an entertainment district in the heart of downtown Las Vegas. In 2004 the city announced plans to redevelop a three block section of Fremont Street east of the Fremont Street Experience as an arts and entertainment area within FEED. The $5.5 million streetscape improvement project was a public private partnership with 50% paid by landlords via new businesses and 50% paid with tax dollars as part of a plans to revitalize Downtown Las Vegas. The area was redesigned to increase the draw to downtown, with a compact entertainment area of bars and clubs.

The three-block renovation included pedestrian-friendly street redesign, landscaping, and retro-looking new neon signage. It also included 4 vintage Vegas neon signs in the street median, built new but reminiscent of classic Las Vegas signs. Fremont East street improvements opened officially in the summer of 2007.

Currently, the Fremont East Entertainment District comprises a total of six blocks. The boundaries are from Las Vegas Boulevard East to 8th Street, and then from Ogden Street South to Carson. The historic El Cortez hotel and casino are within the district as well as the staple cocktail bar Downtown Cocktail Room.  Beyond this district on Fremont businesses include The Writer's Block and the bulk of Tony Hsieh's Downtown Project.

References

External links 

Official Fremont East Entertainment District website
Official Fremont Street Experience website
Vegas Today + Tomorrow: Fremont East
Living in Las Vegas Podcast: review of the Fremont East District
Fremont Street in 1939

Streets in Las Vegas
Downtown Las Vegas
History of Las Vegas
Landmarks in Nevada
U.S. Route 93
U.S. Route 95
Red-light districts in Nevada